Ethan James Green is an American photographer, filmmaker, and director.

Early life 

Green grew up in Caledonia, Michigan, where, at the age of 14, he began photographing his friends. In 2007, at age 17, he signed with Ford Models, and he moved to New York City the following year.

As a model, he appeared in a prominent campaign for Calvin Klein, and was photographed by David Armstrong, appearing in Armstrong's 2011 book 615 Jefferson Ave. He began working at Armstrong's assistant, and Armstrong became his mentor.

Work

In New York, Green continued his earlier practice of photographing his friends. He met potential subjects at clubs and on Instagram, including actress and model Hari Nef, stylist and Interview's fashion director Dara, models Marcs Goldberg and Stevie Triano, writer Devan Diaz, and artist and poet Ser Serpas.

In 2014, Green began taking portraits of his queer, transgender, and nonbinary friends, usually in the Lower East Side's Corlears Hook Park. Green is openly gay and captured friends and figures within carious queer ecosystems in New York. The portraits, some of which appeared on Tumblr, garnered attention, and drew comparisons to Diane Arbus. In 2019, Aperture Foundation published the portraits as the monograph Young New York.

As a commercial photographer, Green has shot covers and editorials for Arena Homme +, Dazed, i-D, Vanity Fair, Vogue, Vogue Italia, Vogue Paris, and W; campaigns for Alexander McQueen, Fendi, Helmut Lang, Miu Miu, Prada, and Versace; and has photographed fashion, pop culture, and queer celebrities such as Naomi Campbell, Bella Hadid, Kate Moss, Rihanna, RuPaul, and John Waters.

In 2022, Green opened the New York Life Gallery, a space dedicated to an experimental approach to art exhibitions and showcasing emerging and overlooked artists. The gallery has shown Steven Cuffie and Drake Carr, amongst others.

Exhibitions
 2019 – Taylor Wessing Photographic Portrait Prize, National Portrait Gallery, London
 2022 – Made to Last, Fotografiska New York, New York City

Publications
  (zine)
 
  (zine)

References

External links
 Ethan James Green on Models.com

21st-century American photographers
1990 births
Living people
Models from Michigan
Photographers from Michigan
American gay artists
People from Kent County, Michigan
LGBT people from Michigan
American LGBT photographers
Gay models